{{Infobox Paralympic event
|event = Powerlifting – Women's 79 kg
|games = 2016 Summer
|image = 
|caption = 
|venue = Riocentro Pavilion 2
|date = 
|competitors = 9
|nations = 9
|win_label = Winning lift
|win_value = 138.0 kg WR
|gold = Bose Omolayo
|goldNPC = NGR
|silver = Xu Lili
|silverNPC = CHN
|bronze = Lin Tzu-hui
|bronzeNPC = TPE
|prev = 2012 (75 kg · 82.5 kg)
|next =
}}

The women's 79 kg powerlifting event''' at the 2016 Summer Paralympics was contested on 12 September at Riocentro Pavilion 2. The event featured five-time Paralympian and three-time Paralympic medalist Lin Tzu-hui, competing for Chinese Taipei. The best outcome out of three attempts counted as the final results. The athlete who placed first in each event was allowed a fourth attempt to break the Paralympic or world record.

Records 
There are twenty powerlifting events, corresponding to ten weight classes each for men and women. The weight categories were significantly adjusted after the 2012 Games so most of the weights are new for 2016. As a result, no Paralympic record was available for this weight class prior to the competition. The existing world records were as follows.

Results

References 

 

Women's 079 kg
Para